Jorhat Theatre is a theatre organization in Jorhat, Assam, India with a history of over a hundred years.

History 
From 1875, Jagannath Barooah's social cultural organization "Jorhat Sarbajanik Sabha" performed various dramas in the festival of Durga Puja in the name of "Jorhat Amateur Theatre". Later in 1896, some key peoples of Jorhat like Chandradhar Baruah, Radha Kanta Handique, Bedanta Baspati, Radhanath Phukon initiated the establishment of "Jorhat Theatre". The first drama performed at Jorhat Theatre was "Ramani Gabhoru" by Bhudhindranath Delihial Bhattacharya, the first secretary of Jorhat Theatre.

Notable acts 

 Sakunir Pratisodh by Ganesh Gogoi
 Naranarayan by Mitradev Mahanta
 Alibaba by Bipin Chandra Baruah
 Bhagya Porikkha by Chandradhar Baruah
 Bhogjora by Phani Sharma
Pandit Ravi Shankar and Alla Rakhas first performance in Assam, 1964
Performance of Shakespeara by Geoffrey Kendal in 1940 and 1965

References

External links 
Facebook
Official Website

Theatrical organisations in India
Culture of Assam